Richmond County Bank Ballpark, styled simply as BallPark on station signage, is an abandoned station on the Staten Island Railway, located at Wall Street and Richmond Terrace.

History
The station was opened on June 24, 2001 in conjunction with the Staten Island Yankees baseball season, serving the team's new Richmond County Bank Ballpark on game days only. It was the newest station on the railway until the opening of Arthur Kill station on January 21, 2017. This station was only operational during the baseball season, which usually ran from June to September. One train was scheduled to travel to/from Tottenville, with two or three shuttle trains from St. George serving the station.

Due to a budget crisis suffered by the Metropolitan Transportation Authority, this station was closed on June 18, 2010, the date of the first scheduled home game of the season. As a result, a short walk from St. George, or traveling on the S40 or S44 buses, is required to reach the stadium. Trains last served the station in September 2009.

Station layout

The station is located underneath the stadium below the northern sidewalk of Richmond Terrace between Wall Street and Hamilton Avenue. It consists of an island platform, with a double wide staircase to Wall Street at the east end and ADA elevator to Hamilton Avenue at the west end.

There are no turnstiles at this station. It is served by a one-track wye which extends from St. George to the southern (geographically eastern) trackway of the station's island platform. Bumper blocks are present at the end of the station, though the wye continues electrified to the end of the ballpark parking lot where it ends at a second set of bumper blocks. The northern trackway currently has no track and is unused.

References

External links

Staten Island Railway at Station Reporter
Staten Island Railway at www.nycsubway.org
 closed entrance from Google Maps Street View

Defunct Staten Island Railway stations
Railway stations closed in 2010
2010 disestablishments in New York (state)
Railway stations in the United States opened in 2001
2001 establishments in New York City
St. George, Staten Island